The Mis Romances Tour was a concert tour performed by Luis Miguel during the year 2002 to promote his 2001 album Mis Romances (during the second half of the tour he also promote his compilation Mis Boleros Favoritos). The tour consisted in 63 concerts and ran through US, Mexico, Argentina, Spain, Chile, Uruguay, Peru, Dominican Republic and Puerto Rico. Miguel performed at Mexico's Aztec Stadium for first time in his career in front of 80,000 spectators, and also gave twelve nights at National Auditorium in Mexico City.

History
To promote Mis Romances, Luis Miguel began his Mis Romances Tour on 24 January 2002 in San Diego, California. After touring in the United States for a month, he performed one show in the Dominican Republic and Puerto Rico. Afterwards, he presented 13 shows in Mexico, including 12 consecutive shows at the National Auditorium. He also performed five shows at the Auditorio Coca-Cola in Monterrey, Mexico. Luis Miguel continued touring in the United States and ended the first leg of the tour 13 April 2002.

Luis Miguel commenced the second leg of his tour on 12 September 2002 in Chula Vista, California and presented three more shows in the United States. Luis Miguel's concerts in North America grossed over $16 million, the highest-grossing tour of the year by a Latin artist. After his performances in the United States, he made five recitals in Spain. He continued the second leg in South America performing in Chile, Peru, Uruguay, and Argentina. The tour concluded on 14 December 2002 in the Dominican Republic.

The Los Angeles Times editor Agustin Gurza compared Luis Miguel's box office sales at the Universal Amphitheater to Julio Iglesias and noted that it contrasted with the low sales of Mis Romances. The set list consisted of boleros from Mis Romances and its predecessors, as well as pop tracks and ballads from his music career.

Tour Set List

Tour dates

Tour Personnel

Band
Vocals: Luis Miguel
Acoustic & electric guitar: Todd Robinson
Bass: Lalo Carrillo
Piano: Francisco Loyo
Keyboards: Arturo Pérez
Drums: Victor Loyo
Percussion: Tommy Aros
Saxophone: Jeff Nathanson
Trumpet: Francisco Abonce
Trombone: Alejandro Carballo
Backing Vocals: Unknown
Mariachi 2000

Notes

References

External links
Concert tracklisting

Luis Miguel concert tours
2002 concert tours

pt:Mis Romances Tour